Sørbymagle is a town on Zealand, Denmark. It is located in Slagelse Municipality. The town is located 6 km south-east of Slagelse and 9 km north-west of Fuglebjerg.

Sørbymagle Church

Sørbymagle Church was built around year 1150. The oldest parts of the church are the choir and nave. A sacristy, church porch and tower are added in the 1400s. The altarpiece is an oil painting depicting Jesus and Peter the Apostle. It was painted by P. Møller in 1898. The church's chalice is from 1647. The pulpit is from 1630. There are two bells in the church. One is from 1834, made in Copenhagen. The other also comes from Copenhagen, and was made in 1897.

References

Cities and towns in Region Zealand
Slagelse Municipality